Ouahigouya Airport  is a former public use airport located near Ouahigouya, Yatenga, Burkina Faso.

See also
List of airports in Burkina Faso

References

External links 
 Airport record for Ouahigouya Airport at Landings.com

Airports in Burkina Faso
Yatenga Province